Sunderland is a railway and metro station in Sunderland, Tyne and Wear, England. It is owned by Network Rail and managed by Northern Trains. Since 31 March 2002, the station has also been served by the Tyne and Wear Metro's Green Line.

History

Earlier stations 

Opening in 1836, the first railway passenger services to Sunderland were provided by the Durham and Sunderland Railway Company, initially linking the then port town with Haswell and Hetton-le-Hole. Approaching from the south along the coast, the terminus, known as Town Moor was located near South Dock.

Undistinguished either in architecture, convenience or accommodation, Town Moor was replaced 22 years later by Hendon. It was situated half a mile to the south, at a point where the line had to be joined by the Newcastle and Darlington Junction Railway Company's line Durham via , which opened in 1853.

In 1854, the Marquis of Londonderry opened the Londonderry, Seaham and Sunderland Railway, which linked the existing Londonderry and South Hetton Collieries to the South Dock. The Londonderry, Seaham and Sunderland Railway began to use the Durham and Sunderland Railway's terminus in 1868. Meanwhile, the York, Newcastle and Berwick Railway had built their station, Fawcett Street, which opened in 1853. It was situated just south of the site of the present station.

Both Fawcett Street and Hendon were closed on the same date. The new station served passengers of both the North Eastern Railway and Londonderry, Seaham and Sunderland Railway, until the latter sold the Sunderland–Seaham route to the former in 1900. This, in turn, allowed the North Eastern Railway to extend the line along the coast to create a new through route to (West) Hartlepool, which opened in 1905.

Present station

The current station, known as Sunderland Central until 5 May 1969, has tracks which lie in a cutting running north and south, bounded by retaining walls to the east and west. The platform area was previously covered by an overall semi-elliptical arched-rib roof, which together with the buildings at the station's north end, suffered significant damage following an air raid in March 1943. In 1953, the roof was replaced by umbrella-type roofing, and the buildings at the southern end of the station were given an interim facelift. The complete rebuilding of the station was deferred, in order to enable advantage to be taken of the site's potential for property development, as well as to ensure compatibility with the town's proposals for the redevelopment of the surrounding area.

The redeveloped station was designed by Frederick Francis Charles Curtis of the British Rail Architects' Department, with construction completed on 4 November 1965. At the time, the development formed part of a complete rebuilding scheme involving almost the entire area of the station site, which was decked over and developed at street level. A single entrance and street-level buildings were located at the northern end of the station, with a second entrance and associated buildings at the south being added five years later.

At the time of reopening, services consisted of a half-hourly service each weekday to Newcastle and an hourly service to and from Middlesbrough via (West) Hartlepool, with additional trains at peak periods. There were also through morning trains to Liverpool and London, as well as a sleeping car service to London each evening.

The second island platform was given over to the working of parcels traffic, as a new parcels office premises was to be built at the northern end of the station. Prior to this, parcels traffic was dealt with at the northern end of the station, using the old stables block to the west for deliveries, with a similar sized room at the eastern side for incoming parcels.

The revised station working enabled the running lines and sidings at the southern end of the station to be simplified. The consequent reduction in permanent way released areas of land at track level, which was available for the erection of support for further street level development around Athenaeum Street and Holmeside.

Further redevelopment took place, ahead of the opening of the Wearside extension of the Tyne and Wear Metro. A six-week closure of the Durham Coast Line between Newcastle and Sunderland took place in early spring 2001, during which the existing track through Sunderland North Tunnel was lowered and two new crossovers introduced. The single island platform was also widened, with a new junction and track arrangement introduced and commissioned to the south of the station.

Refurbishment
In 2006, the Tyne and Wear Passenger Transport Executive announced plans to refurbish of the  platform areas. The project was to be funded by the Department for Transport in an innovative scheme in which the money 'saved' by reducing a subsidised rail service in favour of the Tyne and Wear Metro was converted into a lump sum for capital investment. Whilst the Tyne and Wear Passenger Transport Executive does not own or manage the station (owned by Network Rail and managed by Northern Trains), the rationale for investment being that they are the station's majority operator.

Work began in January 2008, with the second stage of development commencing in September 2009. The project was completed in July 2010 – at a cost of £7million. The project saw the construction of an entirely new floor, ceilings and lighting, substantial improvements to existing walls and a significant reorganisation of buildings and waiting areas on the platforms.

The Tyne and Wear Passenger Transport Executive appointed Sadler Brown Architecture to develop the design, led by Arup. The project incorporated the work of three artists, Jason Bruges Studio, Julian Germain and Morag Morrison. Jason Bruges Studio have created a 140-metre light wall with individual LED units containing an animated display. Julian Germain is providing a sequence of 41 photographs of everyday items 'lost' on the Tyne and Wear Metro, while Morag Morrison is designing coloured glass wall panels for buildings along the island platform.

In October 2015, it was announced that plans were being formulated for the refurbishment of the upper concourse and exterior to improve the station's image and accessibility. Almost six years later, in July 2021, revised plans for the refurbishment were revealed – with an estimated cost of £26million. The six-year project would see the station's south entrance demolished and rebuilt, with the number of tracks passing through the station to be increased to four. Preparatory work commenced in April 2022, with the new southern entrance set to open in early 2023.

Facilities
The station is on two levels. A staffed ticket office located at street (upper) level, which is open between 06:15–18:00 Monday–Saturday and 08:00–17:00 on Sunday. Retail outlets and self-service ticket machines are also located at street level. A waiting room and seating is provided at platform (lower) level, with the two floors connected by lift and escalator. The island platform is fully accessible for wheelchair users. Information is provided with next train audio-visual displays, as well as paper timetable posters.

Layout
The station has a large central island platform with each side split into two numbered platforms. Services operated by Northern Trains call at platforms 1 and 4, which are located at the northern end of the station. Platforms 2 and 3 at the southern end of the station, are served by the Tyne and Wear Metro. Longer trains, such as those operated by Grand Central and London North Eastern Railway board from two adjacent platforms, due to their length.

Until 25 October 2018, the station's layout was unique in Great Britain, in that both heavy rail and light rail services used the same platforms.

Key to diagram

 Black lines: Track shared by Tyne and Wear Metro and National Rail services, electrified at 1500V DC overhead.
 Green lines: Track used by Tyne and Wear Metro services only, electrified at 1500V DC overhead.
 Blue lines: Non-electrified track used by National Rail services only.
 A: Towards Newcastle
 B: From Newcastle
 C: From South Hylton
 D: To South Hylton
 E: Electrified siding
 F: Non-electrified siding
 G: From Middlesbrough
 H: Towards Middlesbrough
 Grey area: Covered station area
 Maroon area: Platforms
 Platform 1: Northern Trains services towards Middlesbrough or Nunthorpe via Hartlepool.
Platform 2: Tyne and Wear Metro services towards South Hylton.
Platform 3: Tyne and Wear Metro services towards (Newcastle) Airport.
Platform 4: Northern Trains services towards Hexham or Carlisle via Newcastle.

Tyne and Wear Metro

On 31 March 2002, the opening of a  extension saw the Tyne and Wear Metro network brought to Wearside – a project costing in the region of £100million.

Existing stations at Brockley Whins, East Boldon and Seaburn were converted for use by the Tyne and Wear Metro, and are no longer served by National Rail services. In addition, three new purpose-built stations were constructed at Fellgate, Stadium of Light, and St Peter's.

Heading south, services run to South Hylton along the alignment of the Penshaw–Sunderland line, which fell victim to the Beeching Axe on 4 May 1964. A total of five purpose-built stations were constructed at Park Lane, University (Sunderland), Millfield, Pallion and South Hylton.

Services

Grand Central
Following the December 2021 timetable change, Grand Central operate five trains per day (four on Sunday) between Sunderland and London King's Cross via York.

Rolling stock used: Class 180 Adelante

London North Eastern Railway
Following the December 2021 timetable change, London North Eastern Railway operate a once-daily weekday service between Sunderland and London King's Cross via York and Newcastle.

Rolling stock used: Class 800 Azuma

Northern Trains
Following the December 2021 timetable change, Northern Trains operate an hourly service between Newcastle and Middlesbrough via Hartlepool. Most trains extend to Hexham (or Carlisle on Sunday) and Nunthorpe. Two trains per day (three on Sunday) continue to Whitby.

Rolling stock used: Class 156 Super Sprinter and Class 158 Express Sprinter

Tyne and Wear Metro
, Tyne and Wear Metro operates up to five trains per hour on weekdays and Saturday, and up to four trains per hour during the evening and on Sunday between South Hylton and Newcastle Airport.

Rolling stock used: Class 599 Metrocar

Notes

References

Sources

Further reading

External links
 
 

Transport in the City of Sunderland
Railway stations in Tyne and Wear
DfT Category C2 stations
Former North Eastern Railway (UK) stations
Railway stations in Great Britain opened in 1879
Railway stations in Great Britain opened in 2002
Railway stations served by Grand Central Railway
Railway stations served by London North Eastern Railway
Northern franchise railway stations
2002 establishments in England
Railway stations located underground in the United Kingdom